Sergejs Višegorodcevs (born May 22, 1976) is a Latvian former professional ice hockey defenceman.

Career 
Višegorodcevs played in the Russian Superleague for CSKA Moscow from 1996 to 1998 and again from 2001 to 2002. He also played the Metal Ligaen in Denmark for the Odense Bulldogs and the Ligue Magnus in France for Ours de Villard-de-Lans.

He also played for the Minnesota Blue Ox in Roller Hockey International during the 1999 RHI season.

Career statistics

References

External links

1976 births
Living people
Asheville Aces players
ASK/Ogre players
HC CSKA Moscow players
Jacksonville Barracudas (SPHL) players
Latvian ice hockey defencemen
HK Liepājas Metalurgs players
Memphis RiverKings players
Minnesota Blue Ox players
Odense Bulldogs players
Ours de Villard-de-Lans players
HK Riga 2000 players
Rockford IceHogs (UHL) players
San Diego Gulls (WCHL) players
Ice hockey people from Riga